The military history of the modern-day Russian Federation has antecedents involving Kievan Rus' and the Rus' principalities that succeeded it, the Mongol invasion of the early 13th century, Russia's numerous wars against Turkey, against Poland, Lithuania and Sweden, the Seven Years' War, France (especially the Napoleonic Wars), and the Crimean War of 1853–1856. The 20th century saw Russia's involvement in two world wars against Germany, as well as smaller military actions against breakaway provinces and Poland. During the Cold War (1947 to 1990), the greatly enlarged military suppressed rebellions in Eastern Europe and became a nuclear superpower hostile to NATO and the United States, as well as China after 1960. The post-Cold War military history of the Russian Federation itself began in 1991.

Period surveys include:
 the military history of Kievan Rus' and other states leading up to Muscovy (the Grand Duchy of Moscow)
 the Tsardom of Russia
 Military history of the Russian Empire
 Military history of the Soviet Union
 Military history of the Russian Federation

See also
 History of Russia
 Foreign policy of the Russian Empire
 Russo-Turkish wars
 Russia and the Middle East
 Timeline of Russian history
 Timeline of Russian innovation
 List of wars involving Russia

Further reading
 Captivating History. The Eastern Front: A Captivating Guide to Soviet Union in World War 2, the Winter War, Siege of Leningrad, Operation Barbarossa and Battle of Stalingrad (2020) excerpt 
 Dale, Robert. "Rats and Resentment: The Demobilization of the Red Army in Postwar Leningrad, 1945—50." Journal of Contemporary History 45.1 (2010): 113-133. online
 Davies, Brian L. "The Development of Russian Military Power 1453–1815." in Jeremy Black, ed., European Warfare 1453–1815 (Macmillan Education UK, 1999) pp. 145–179.
 De Madariaga, Isabel. Russia in the Age of Catherine the Great (2002).r, William C. Strategy and Power in Russia 1600-1914 (1998) excerpts 
 Daugherty III, Leo J. "'Through a Looking Glass': The United States Army Looks at the Red Army of Workers and Peasants 1919–1926." Journal of Slavic Military Studies 22.1 (2009): 125-142.
 Dowling, Timothy. The Brusilov Offensive (Indiana UP, 2008).
 Duffy,  Christopher. Russia's Military Way to the West: Origins and Nature of Russian Military Power, 1700–1800 (Routledge, 1981)
 Fuller, Jr., William C. Strategy and Power in Russia, 1600–1914 (1992)
 Glantz, David M. and Jonathan M. House. When Titans Clashed: How the Red Army Stopped Hitler (UP of Kansas, 1995)
 Hagen, Mark. Soldiers in the Proletarian Dictatorship (Cornell UP, 2019) on 1920s.
 Harrison, Richard W. The Russian Way of War: Operational Art, 1904-1940 (2001) excerpt
 Hartley, Janet M. Russia, 1762-1825: military power, the state, and the people (ABC-CLIO, 2008).
  pp 63–91.
 Kagan, Frederick, and Robin Higham, eds. The Military History of Tsarist Russia (2008) excerpts
 Keep, John. Soldiers of the Tsar: Army and Society in Russia, 1462–1874 (Oxford UP, 1985).
 LeDonne, John P. The Russian Empire and the World, 1700–1917: The Geopolitics of Expansion and Containment (Oxford UP, 1997)
 LeDonne, John P. The Grand Strategy of the Russian Empire, 1650–1831 (Oxford UP, 2004). 
 Lehrke, Jesse Paul. The transition to national armies in the former Soviet republics, 1988-2005 (Routledge, 2013).
 Lieven, Dominic. Russia Against Napoleon: The True Story of the Campaigns of War and Peace (2011).
 Lincoln, W. Bruce. Passage Through Armageddon: The Russians in War and Revolution, 1914–1918 (1986), popular history.
 Lohr, Eric. "The Russian Army in World War I." Kritika: Explorations in Russian and Eurasian History 17.3 (2016): 688-697. online
 Menning, Bruce W. "Russian military innovation in the second half of the eighteenth Century." War & Society (1984) 2#1 pp. 23–41. online
 Miner, Steven M. "Military Crisis and Social Change in Russian and Soviet History." in Soviet National Security Policy Under Perestroika (Routledge, 2021) pp. 29-46.
 Overy, Richard. Russia's War (1998), on World War II
 Paul, Michael C. “The Military Revolution in Russia, 1550–1682,” Journal of Military History 68#1 (January 2004), pp. 9–46.
 Reese, Roger. The Soviet Military Experience: A History of the Soviet Army, 1917–1991 (Routledge, 2000) 
 Riasanovsky, Nicholas V. and Mark D. Steinberg. A History of Russia (7th ed. 2004) 800 pages.
 Roberts, Geoffrey. Stalin's Wars: From World War to Cold War, 1939-1953 (2008)  excerpt and text search
 Robinson, Paul. "A Study of Grand Duke Nikolai Nikolaevich as Supreme Commander of the Russian Army, 1914–1915." Historian 75.3 (2013): 475-498.
 Sanborn, Josh. "The mobilization of 1914 and the question of the Russian nation: A reexamination." Slavic Review 59.2 (2000): 267-289. online
 Sanborn, Joshua. "The genesis of Russian warlordism: Violence and governance during the First World War and the Civil War." Contemporary European History 19.3 (2010): 195-213.
 Schimmelpenninck van der Oye, David, and Bruce Menning, eds. Reforming the Tsar's Army: Military Innovation in Imperial Russia from Peter the Great to the Revolution (Cambridge UP, 2004). scholarly essays
 Sirotkina, Irina. "7. The Politics of Etiology: Shell Shock in the Russian Army, 1914–1918." in Madness and the mad in Russian culture (University of Toronto Press, 2016) pp. 117-129.
 Steinberg, John W. "The military history of Romanov Russia." War & Society (2021): 1-14.
 Steinberg, John W. et al. eds. The Russo-Japanese War in Global Perspective: World War Zero (Leiden: Brill, 2005).
 Stoff, Laurie. "They Fought for Russia: Female Soldiers of the First World War." in A Soldier and A Woman: Sexual Integration in the Military (2000).
 Stone, David. A Military History of Russia: From Ivan the Terrible to the War in Chechnya (2006) excerpts
 Stone, David R. The Russian Army in the Great War: The Eastern Front, 1914–1917 (University Press of Kansas, 2015)
 Stone, Norman. The Eastern Front 1914–1917 (Scribner's, 1975).
 Turner, Leonard Charles Frederick. "The Russian Mobilization in 1914." Journal of Contemporary History 3.1 (1968): 65-88.
 Wildman, Allan K. The End of the Russian Imperial Army (Princeton University Press, 1980).

External links
 "Russian Military History" a guide by Reina Pennington
 Mark Conrad's Home Page - Russian Military History